Ali Ouabbou (born 3 April 1941) is a Moroccan boxer. He competed in the men's flyweight event at the 1972 Summer Olympics.

References

1941 births
Living people
Moroccan male boxers
Olympic boxers of Morocco
Boxers at the 1972 Summer Olympics
Place of birth missing (living people)
Flyweight boxers